Bernhard Mistlberger (born 1987) is an Austrian theoretical particle physicist known for his significant work in the area of quantum field theory. He is known for multi-loop calculations in quantum chromodynamics (QCD), including the first high-precision theoretical predictions of Higgs and vector boson production at the Large Hadron Collider.

Career 
Since 2020, Mistlberger has been a faculty member in the SLAC Theory Group at Stanford University. He was previously a Pappalardo Fellow in the Center for Theoretical Physics at MIT, and a research fellow at CERN.

In 2020, he was awarded the Wu-Ki Tung Award for Early-Career Research on QCD, for "pioneering theoretical computations of multi-loop radiative contributions for precision Higgs and electroweak physics at hadron colliders".

In 2021, he was awarded the European Physical Society’s Gribov Medal, for "groundbreaking contributions to multi-loop computations in QCD and to high-precision predictions of Higgs and vector boson production at hadron colliders".

In 2022, he won the American Physical Society's Henry Primakoff Award for Early-Career Particle Physics, for "groundbreaking contributions to high-precision quantum field theory, including the next-to-next-to-next-to-leading order QCD corrections to the production of Higgs and electroweak vector bosons at hadron colliders." In the same year, he also won the Guido Altarelli Award for "advancing the frontier of perturbative calculations in QCD to N3LO".

References

External links
 

1987 births
Living people
21st-century Austrian physicists
Theoretical physicists
Austrian expatriates in the United States
Stanford University faculty
ETH Zurich alumni
Particle physicists
People associated with CERN